Erik Johansson (born 29 October 1974) is a Swedish former modern pentathlete. He competed in the men's individual event at the 2004 Summer Olympics.

References

External links
 

1974 births
Living people
Swedish male modern pentathletes
Olympic modern pentathletes of Sweden
Modern pentathletes at the 2004 Summer Olympics
Sportspeople from Uppsala
20th-century Swedish people